Olha Skrypak (born 2 December 1990) is a Ukrainian athlete who competes in the long-distance events.

Skrypak won the bronze medal at the 2012 European Athletics Championships in Helsinki at the 10,000 metres event.

In 2020, she competed in the women's half marathon at the 2020 World Athletics Half Marathon Championships held in Gdynia, Poland.

References

External links 
 

1990 births
Living people
Ukrainian female long-distance runners
Olympic athletes of Ukraine
Athletes (track and field) at the 2012 Summer Olympics
European Athletics Championships medalists